The Hungarian University of Fine Arts (Hungarian: Magyar Képzőművészeti Egyetem, MKE) is the central Hungarian art school in Budapest, Andrássy Avenue. It was founded in 1871 as the Hungarian Royal Drawing School (Magyar Királyi Mintarajztanoda) and has been called University of Fine Arts since 2001.

History
Until the mid-19th century, Hungarian artists were learning fine arts in Western European academies. The National Society of Hungarian Fine Arts (Országos Magyar Képzőművészeti Társulat) founded in 1861 was initiating the establishment of a Hungarian school of fine arts. Owing to this movement the Hungarian Royal Drawing School and Art Teachers’ College (Magyar Királyi Mintarajztanoda és Rajztanárképezde) was opened in 1871. The present-day building of the university was built in 1877, designed by Alajos Rauscher and Adolf Lang.

In later decades, the school developed programs for training not only painters and sculptors, but artist-craftsmen, mosaic- and gobelin-makers, stage designers, costumers, and restorers. Numerous prominent Hungarian artists taught there, including the painters Károly Ferenczy, János Vaszary, Viktor Olgyai, Róbert Berény,  Aurél Bernáth, Jenő Barcsay, and  Márta Lacza; sculptor Béni Ferenczy and other notable artists.

Presidents from 1871

Buildings 
 Hungarian University of Fine Arts (Hungary, Budapest, 1062 Andrássy út 69–71.) with the Barcsay-hall.
 Strawberry's Garden (Budapest, 1063 Kmety Gy u. 26–28. )
 Feszty House (Budapest, 1063, Bajza u. 39)
 Somogyi József Artists' Colony (Tihany, 8237 Major u. 63.)

Departments 
 Program in Fine Art Theory
 Visual Education Program
 Scenography Program
 Intermedia Program
 Conservation Program
 Graphic Design Program
 Printmaking Program
 Sculpture Program
 Painting Program
 Doctoral Programme

Notable people

 1879-1959 Jenő Bory
 1934-2008: János Major, graphic artist
 1946: Orshi Drozdik, Feminist artist
 2002: Márta Kucsora, contemporary artist

Exhibitions 
Barcsay-hall (Barcsay-terem) is the biggest gallery to exhibit the student's and foreign's artworks. But you will find four other smaller places to show the artworks.

External links 

 
Education in Budapest
Universities and colleges in Hungary
1871 establishments in Austria-Hungary
Educational institutions established in 1871
Public universities